Artistic swimming (formerly synchronized swimming) competitions at the 2024 Summer Olympics in Paris, France are scheduled to run between 5 and 10 August at the Paris Aquatics Centre. Unlike in the previous edition, the number of swimmers competing across two events at these Games has been reduced from 104 to 96. 

Several significant changes are instituted in the artistic swimming program for Paris 2024 to reinforce gender equality and vast diversity among the nations in the qualifying process. On October 7, 2022, FINA favored nearly 99 percent of the votes to amend the artistic swimming rules between 2022 and 2025, such as the composition of an eight-member team and a maximum number of two males in the team.

Qualification 

For the team event, the highest-ranked NOC in each of the five continental meets, except for the host nation France (representing Europe), will obtain a quota place, while the remaining NOCs will compete for the five available spots at the 2024 World Aquatics Championships. For the duet, the highest-ranked NOC from each of the five continental meets that do not have a qualified team assures a coveted spot, with the remaining NOCs vying for the three remaining spots through the 2024 Worlds. All ten NOCs eligible to compete in the team event must select two members to form a duet.

Participating nations

Competition schedule

Medal summary

Medal table

Medalists

See also
Artistic swimming at the 2022 Asian Games
Artistic swimming at the 2023 Pan American Games

References 

 
2024 in synchronized swimming
Synchronized swimming competitions in France
International aquatics competitions hosted by France
2024
2024 Summer Olympics events